Moore's Auto Body and Paint Shop, formerly known as Standard Gas and Oil Supply Station, is a historic filling station located in Richmond, Virginia. The oldest section was originally built as a stable in 1875.  It was enlarged in 1926.  It is a one-story, stuccoed brick building in the Spanish Colonial Revival style.  The structure has an irregular plan, with the northern facade formed in a crescent shape and the rest of the building in rectangular forms.  The central section features heavy paneled stuccoed pilasters connected by a corbeled brick table and a paneled parapet.  The building was used as a filling station until 1936, after which it was occupied by a series of automobile repair businesses.

It was listed on the National Register of Historic Places in 1994.

References

Spanish Colonial Revival architecture in the United States
Commercial buildings completed in 1926
Buildings and structures in Richmond, Virginia
National Register of Historic Places in Richmond, Virginia
Gas stations on the National Register of Historic Places in Virginia